Kipling Airport  is located adjacent to Kipling, Saskatchewan, Canada.

See also 
List of airports in Saskatchewan

References 

Registered aerodromes in Saskatchewan
Kingsley No. 124, Saskatchewan